Lake Inman is a small lake in McPherson County, Kansas, United States. With a surface area of approximately 1/4 square miles (.6 square km), it is the largest natural lake in the state. It was named for frontiersman and author Henry Inman, who wrote articles about fishing that prompted Kansas legislation.
Lake Inman is part of the McPherson Valley Wetlands, a disconnected complex of wetlands important for migrating waterfowl.

See also
 List of Kansas state parks
 List of lakes, reservoirs, and dams in Kansas
 List of rivers of Kansas

References

Bodies of water of McPherson County, Kansas
Inman